Steve Murdoch is an academic and writer. He is author on the history of 
Scotland and the Wider World in general and of Scotland and Scandinavia in particular. His monographs include Britain, Denmark-Norway and the House of Stuart, 1603-1660 (2000/2003); Network North: Scottish Kin, Commercial and Covert Associations in Northern Europe, 1603-1746 (2006) and the book The Terror of the Seas? Scottish Maritime Warfare, 1513-1713 (2010). In 2014 he published the co-authored book (with Alexia Grosjean) Alexander Leslie and the Scottish Generals of the Thirty Years' War, 1618-1648.  He has edited several volumes including Scotland and the Thirty Years' War, 1618-1648 (2000) and with Alexia Grosjean Scottish Communities Abroad in the Early Modern Period (2005). This same pairing created the Scotland, Scandinavia and Northern European Biographical Database (SSNE).

Murdoch's first job after gaining his PhD from the University of Aberdeen in 1998 was as a research associate at The Roehampton Institute (based in Scandinavia as a researcher for Professor Peter Edwards). He thereafter gained a four-year AHRC funded post-doctoral fellowship at the University of Aberdeen (2000-2003). Murdoch was awarded a lectureship at the University of St Andrews (School of History) in January 2004. After only two years in post he was promoted Reader in 2006 and, four years later, full-Professor in 2010. Murdoch was nominated for, and won, the Olof Palme Professorship in Peace Studies by Vetenskapsrådet (The Swedish Research Council) for the academic year 2013–2014.

In 2018, Murdoch was awarded an honorary five year Visiting Professorship at the UHI Institute for Northern Studies for services to the institute.

Murdoch left the University of St Andrews in September 2021 after 17 years of service to that institution, and as part of the teaching staff that saw the university gain top spot in the UK University rankings for the first time.

In April 2022 Murdoch began working at The Swedish Defence University (Försvarshögskolan) as a lecturer. His promotion to Professor of Military History was confirmed the following month on 1 May.

Main publications
 Unimpeded Sailing: A Critical Edition of Johan Grönings Navigatio libera (Extended 1698 Edition) (2019) with Peter Maxwell-Stuart (translator) and Leos Müller (co-editor)
Alexander Leslie and the Scottish Generals of the Thirty Years' War, 1618-1648  (2014) with Alexia Grosjean
The Terror of the Seas? Scottish Maritime Warfare, 1513-1713 (2010)
The Navigator. The Log of John Anderson, VOC Pilot-Major, 1640-1643 (2010) with co-editors Victor Enthoven and Eila Williamson
Network North: Scottish Kin, Commercial and Covert Associations in Northern Europe, 1603-1746 (2006)
Scottish Communities Abroad in the Early Modern Period  (2005) with Alexia Grosjean
Scotland and the Thirty Years' War, 1618-1648 (2001)
Britain, Denmark-Norway and the House of Stuart, 1603-1660 (2000)

References
Academia.edu

External links
 The Scotland, Scandinavia and European Biographical Database: *The Scotland, Scandinavia and Northern European Biographical Database (SSNE)

ORCID ID: ORCID Profile
 Steve Murdoch on Academia.edu:

21st-century Scottish historians
Alumni of the University of Aberdeen
Living people
Year of birth missing (living people)